The NS 5600 was a series of steam locomotives of the Dutch Railways (NS) and its predecessors Maatschappij tot Exploitatie van Staatsspoorwegen (SS) and Nederlandsche Centraal-Spoorweg-Maatschappij (NCS).

Delivery with the 1'B wheel arrangement 
The Pommersche Centralbahn, founded in 1870, ordered a number of steam locomotives for the new railway line from Wangerin via Neustettin to Konitz from the locomotive factory of George Egestorff in Hanover, since 1871 called Hanomag. As a result of the Franco-Prussian War, the Pommersche Centralbahn ran into financial difficulties and was filed for bankruptcy in 1873, after which the order with Hanomag was also cancelled. The locomotives already under construction were stored in the warehouse. 

When the NCS placed an order for three 1'B locomotives at Hanomag in 1874, the partly built locomotives for the Pommersche Centralbahn were completed for the NCS. These entered service in 1874 with the numbers 16-18 and the names Kraton, Atchin and Sumatra. Two years later, the NCS placed a follow-up order for two locomotives, which were put into service in 1876 as the 19–20 with the names Java and Borneo. They were 1'B locomotives with a four-wheeled tender.

Rebuilding into a 2'B wheel arrangement 
In 1882 and 1883, No. 19 and 18 respectively were fitted with a new boiler. Between 1891 and 1897 all boilers were replaced by boilers with a maximum steam pressure of 10 kg/cm2 (142.2 psi), starting with No. 17, followed by No. 20, 16, 19 and 18. With No. 18, to reduce the axle load, the front barrel axle replaced by two barrel axles, making the wheel arrangement 2'B. The other locomotives were rebuilt accordingly between 1900 and 1905, whereby the four-wheeled tender was also replaced by a larger six-wheeled tender from the series 21–25. The tender of No. 18 was replaced in 1901.

Rebuilding into a tender engine with the 2'B2' wheel arrangement 
A second major rebuild took place in between 1913 and 1915, during which the five locomotives were rebuilt into 2'B2' (4-4-4) tank engines for local service. The frame was extended and supported by a two-axle bogie. The cab was replaced, a water tank was placed on both sides of the boiler and behind the cab a coal bunker was fitted. During this rebuild, the cylinder castings were also replaced by ones with a large diameter and the locomotives were also fitted with a superheater.

Merger into the SS and later the NS 
In 1919 the operation of the NCS was taken over by the SS, with these locomotives being included in the SS numbering as 81-85 (second occupation of these numbers). When the fleet of the SS and the Hollandsche IJzeren Spoorweg-Maatschappij was merged in 1921, the locomotives of this series were given the NS numbers 5601–5605. These locomotives were withdrawn from service between 1925 and 1927.

Specifications

Overview

Sources and references 

 N. J. van Wijck Jurriaanse: De Nederlandsche Centraal Spoorwegmaatschappij. Uitg. Wyt, Rotterdam, 1973. .
 Het Utrechts archief

Rolling stock of the Netherlands
Hanomag locomotives
Steam locomotives of the Netherlands
Maatschappij tot Exploitatie van Staatsspoorwegen